Zamma is a two-player abstract strategy game from Africa. It is especially played in North Africa. The game is similar to alquerque and draughts. Board sizes vary, but they are square boards, such as 5x5 or 9x9 square grids with left and right diagonal lines running through several intersection points (or "points") of the board. One could think of the 5x5 board as a standard alquerque board, but with additional diagonal lines, and the 9x9 board as four standard alquerque boards combined, but no additional diagonal lines are added. The initial setup is also similar to alquerque, where every space on the board is filled with each player's pieces except for the middle point of the board. Furthermore, each player's pieces are also set up on their respective half of the board. The game specifically resembles draughts in that pieces must move in the forward directions until they are crowned "Mullah" (or "Sultan") which is the equivalent of the king in draughts. The Mullah can move in any direction. In North Africa, the black pieces are referred to as men, and the white pieces as women. In the Sahara, short sticks represent the men, and camel dung represent the women.

The game goes by several names such as damma, and in Mauritania as srand or dhamet, where it is a national game. Mauritania's version is different from the other variants in that the pieces captured are instantly removed from the board, whereas, in other variants the removal of captured pieces is deferred.

Setup 
Board sizes vary. Examples are 5x5 and 9x9 square grids. Left and right diagonal lines run through several points of the square grid. The 5x5 square grid has left and right diagonal lines running through each point of the square grid (the additional points created by the intersection of the left and right diagonal lines within each square may or may not be considered a point on dhe board for pieces to be placed on). The 9x9 square grid is four standard Alquerque boards combined to form a larger square grid, but no additional diagonal lines are added. Each player's pieces are distinguishable from the other player, for example, one plays with black pieces and the other with white pieces. Every point of the board is occupied by a piece except for the central point. Each player's pieces are placed on their respective half of the board; on the central row, each player places their pieces to their respective right of the central point.

Rules 
 Players alternate their turns. Black moves first. A piece moves forward only (straight forward or diagonally forward) one space per turn following the pattern on the board until they are crowned Mullah by reaching the last rank. Only one piece may be moved or used to capture enemy piece(s) per turn.
 A (non-Mullah) piece may capture an enemy piece by the short leap as in draughts or Alquerqe. The capture can be in any direction. Multiple captures are allowed, however, the line with the most captures must be taken. Captures are compulsory for non-Mullah and Mullah pieces.
 When a piece reaches the other player's rank, it is promoted to Mullah. The Mullah can move in any direction, and capture in any direction. It can also move any number of spaces as in the King in international draughts. The Mullah can also land anywhere behind the captured piece. If playing a variant where enemy pieces are not removed immediately when captured, the Mullah can not go back to any of them and leap them again. However, in Mauritania's variant captured pieces are removed immediately, the Mullah can leap over them again in order to leap another enemy piece(s).
 If a non-Mullah piece reaches the other player's rank as an intermediate step of a capturing sequence, the piece does not get promoted to Mullah.
 The player who captures all their opponent's pieces is the winner.

Related Games 
 Felli
 Kharbaga
 Khreibga

References

Additional reading 

Abstract strategy games
Traditional board games
African games